Ronald Dean Cornelius (February 14, 1945 – August 18, 2021) was a session musician and producer who has played on albums by Leonard Cohen, Bob Dylan, Al Kooper and Loudon Wainwright III. He was also the president of Gateway Entertainment which was established in 1986. As a producer he has produced Miko Marks's Freeway Bound album in 2007. He is also the co-writer of "Chelsea Hotel No. 2" (with Cohen), which has been covered by many artists including Rufus Wainwright.

Biography
In the mid-1960s Cornelius was a member of Capt. Zoom & The Androids aka Captain Zoom. They released three singles including "Here Comes Captain Zoom" b/w "The Zoom". Later he was a key member of a folk country rock band called West that was formed in San Francisco in 1967 that also featured Cornelius on lead guitar and vocals, Michael Stewart on guitar. Other members were Joe Davis, Bob Claire, Jon Sagen and Lloyd Perata. The band recorded the album West in 1968 and two others.

His solo album Tin Luck released on Polydor, PD50ll featured Joe Davis on bass and Paul Distel on drums. Cornelius played both guitar and keyboards. Most of the tracks on the album were composed by him.

Productions
He produced the third album by Miko Marks which was scheduled for release in spring 2007.

Session work
Cornelius played guitar on the album Self Portrait by Bob Dylan, playing with Charles E. Daniels and Bubba Fowler at the Columbia Recording Studios, Nashville, Tennessee on March 17, 1970. The session was produced by Bob Johnston and the tracks were "Early Morning Rain" and "Woogie Boogie". Cornelius also worked alongside Charlie McCoy, Al Kooper and David Bromberg in a recording session for Bob Dylan's 1973 album Dylan.

Solo discography
 Tin Luck, Polydor PD5011

Session discography (partial)
 Leonard Cohen, Songs from a Room, acoustic and electric guitar
 Leonard Cohen, Songs of Love and Hate, guitar
 Leonard Cohen, Live At The Isle of Wight 1970, guitar
 Bob Dylan, Self Portrait, guitar
 Bob Dylan, New Morning, guitar
 Bob Dylan, The Bootleg Series Vol. 10: Another Self Portrait (1969–1971)
 Al Kooper, Al's Big Deal – Unclaimed Freight, guitar
 Loudon Wainwright III, Attempted Mustache, acoustic guitar, electric guitar

References

Links
 Gateway Entertainment
 All Music Credits
 Interview with Ron Cornelius by Jack Fleischer

1945 births
2021 deaths
American male songwriters
American record producers
American country banjoists
American country guitarists
American male guitarists
American rock musicians
Place of birth missing